Kaspiysk bombing may refer to:
1996 Kaspiysk bombing
2002 Kaspiysk bombing